Davydov, or Davydova (feminine), is a surname common in Russia and Ukraine.

Alexander Davydov, Soviet and Ukrainian physicist
Alexander Davydov, Soviet Red Army major and an illegitimate child of Joseph Stalin
Alexander Davydov, Russian opera singer
Alexander Lvovich Davydov, Russian major-general
Avgust Davydov, Russian mathematician and mechanic
Boris Davydov, Russian hydrographer and geodesist
Denis Davydov, Russian poet and leader in the partisan movement during the Patriotic War
Evgeny Davydov, Russian hockey player
Evgraf Davydov, Russian major-general
Ivan Davydov, Russian academician, professor of philosophy, Latin and Russian literature
Karl Davydov, Russian cellist, conductor, composer, and pedagogue
Konstantin Davydov, a Russian zoologist and embryologist
Kyrylo Davydov, (born 1988) Ukrainian footballer
Lev Davydov, Russian geographer and hydrographer
Nikolai Davydov (1921–1949), Soviet aircraft pilot and Hero of the Soviet Union
Serhiy Davydov, (born 1984) Ukrainian footballer
Stepan Davydov, Russian composer and singer
Vasili Davydov, member of the Decembrist movement
Vasily Davydov, Russian psychologist and educationist
Vasily Innokentyevich Davydov (1919–1968), Soviet army officer and Hero of the Soviet Union
Vera Davydova, Soviet singer and pedagogue
Viktor Davydov (1920–1952), Soviet aircraft pilot and Hero of the Soviet Union
Vitaly Davydov, Soviet hockey player
Vladimir Davydov, Russian actor
Yelena Davydova, Soviet gymnast

See also
Davidov (disambiguation)
Davydovo

Russian-language surnames

Surnames from given names